Gjilan is a city in east-central Kosovo.

Gjilan may also refer to:

 District of Gjilan, an administrative district surrounding Gjilan
 Gnjilan (Pirot), a village in Serbia